Glinda of Oz is the fourteenth Land of Oz book written by children's author L. Frank Baum, published on July 10, 1920. It is the last book of the original Oz series, which was later continued by other authors. Like most of the Oz books, the plot features a journey through some of the remoter regions of Oz; though in this case the pattern is doubled: Dorothy and Ozma travel to stop a war between the Flatheads and Skeezers; then Glinda and a cohort of Dorothy's friends set out to rescue them.  The book was dedicated to Baum's second son, Robert Stanton Baum.

Plot
Princess Ozma and Dorothy travel to an obscure corner of the Land of Oz, in order to prevent a war between two local powers, the Skeezers and the Flatheads. The leaders of the two tribes prove obstinate, and are determined to fight in spite of Ozma and Dorothy. Unable to prevent the war, Dorothy and Ozma find themselves imprisoned on the Skeezers' glass-covered island, which has been magically submerged to the bottom of its lake. Their situation worsens when the warlike queen Coo-ee-oh, who is holding them captive and who alone knows how to raise the island back to the surface of the lake, loses her battle and gets transformed into a swan, forgetting all her magic in the process, and leaving the inhabitants of the island, with Ozma and Dorothy, trapped at the bottom of the lake. Ozma and Dorothy summon Glinda, who, with help from several magicians and magical assistants, must find a way to raise the island to the surface of the lake again, and liberate its inhabitants.

Original manuscript
The printed text of the book features one significant change from Baum's manuscript. In the manuscript, Red Reera first appears as a skeleton, its bones wired together, with glowing red eyes in the sockets of its skull. The printed text makes Reera the Red first appear as a gray ape in an apron and lace cap — a comical sight rather than a frightening and disturbing specter. The change was most likely made by Baum at the suggestion of his editors. Other changes in the manuscript, made by an unknown editor at Reilly & Lee, are relatively trivial, and do not always improve the text.

The submerged city of the Skeezers in this book may have been suggested to Baum by the semi-submerged Temple of Isis at Philae in Egypt, which the Baums had seen on their trip to Europe and Egypt in the first six months of 1906.

Film adaptation

The 2015 short film The Land of Oz is an adaptation of Chapter 8 in this book, which outlines both the history and the current state of affairs in Oz. This short film is an almost word to word rendering of Dorothy and Ozma's meeting with Coo-ee-oh, although Coo-ee-oh is portrayed as a King rather than a Queen in this version.

References
Notes

Bibliography

External links

The Land of Oz

A discussion of the book

Oz (franchise) books
1920 American novels
1920 fantasy novels
Novels published posthumously
Sequel novels
American fantasy novels adapted into films
1920 children's books